Raymond Moore and Roscoe Tanner were the defending champions but lost in the second round to David Graham and John Sadri.

Gene Mayer and Sandy Mayer won in the final 6–4, 7–6 against Cliff Drysdale and Bruce Manson.

Seeds

Draw

Final

Top half

Bottom half

References

External links
 1979 Congoleum Classic Doubles draw

Congoleum Classic Doubles